Siddiqur Rahman Sarker SGP, PBGM, hdmc, psc is a retired major general, two-star rank officer in the Bangladesh Army and a former Engineer-in-Chief at the Bangladesh Army Headquarters. He has also served as the commandant of Military Institute of Science and Technology. He commanded the 14 independent Engineer Brigade.

Early life and education
Sarkar was born 10 August 1963 in Narsingdi, East Pakistan.  On 22 January 1982 he joined Bangladesh Military Academy. He was commissioned on 23 December 1983 in the corps of Engineers of Bangladesh Army. He did his undergraduate and graduate in Civil Engineering from Bangladesh University of Engineering and Technology. He also graduated from Defence Services Command and Staff College, National University of Bangladesh and Osmania University of India.

Career
He held a number of command posts in Bangladesh Army. He commanded the 16 Engineer Construction Battalion, a battalion of Bangladesh Border Guards and He has also served as the Commander of 14 Independent Engineer Brigade with effect from January 2011 to 31 December 2012 and Area Commander, Logistics Area from 1 January 2013 to June 2013. He was promoted to Major General on 1 January 2013 . He was made commandant of Military Institute of Science and Technology in June 2013 and Engineer-in-Chief of Bangladesh Army in August 2015.

Awards
he has received two notable awards
 President Border Guard Medal for role as sector commander after the Bangladesh Rifles Mutiny.
 Sena Gourab Padak from Bangladesh Army for his service from 2011 to 2012.

References

Living people
Bangladesh Army generals
Engineers in Chief of the Bangladesh Army
1963 births